Tommy Wayne Barnes (April 12, 1951 – March 7, 2013) was an American football player and coach. He served as the head football coach at the University of Arkansas at Monticello from 1985 to 1996, compiling a record of 69–53–1. Barnes also had a successful tenure as a high school football coach at Montrose Academy in Montrose, Arkansas.

Head coaching record

College

References

1951 births
2013 deaths
American football fullbacks
Arkansas–Monticello Boll Weevils football coaches
Arkansas–Monticello Boll Weevils football players
High school football coaches in Arkansas
People from Fordyce, Arkansas
Players of American football from Arkansas